Fort Tonoloway State Park is an undeveloped Maryland state park located near present-day Hancock. Fort Tonoloway was a frontier fort built in 1755 by Lt. Thomas Stoddert and men from the Maryland State Militia. The fort was also known as Stoddert's Fort. It was abandoned in 1756 when Fort Frederick was constructed.

The state park was at one time leased to the Boy Scouts. It is awaiting archaeological investigation before its use as a recreational facility can be assessed.

References

Further reading
Tonoloway Fort: Outpost on the Maryland Frontier, Gerald Sword, Friends of Fort Frederick, 1994, ASIN: B002X49ZMA.

External links
Finding Fort Tonoloway: A French and Indian War Fortification on the Western Frontier of Maryland Preservation Maryland

State parks of Maryland
Parks in Washington County, Maryland
IUCN Category III